Windswept House: A Vatican Novel is a 1996 novel by Roman Catholic priest and theologian Malachi Martin. The book charts the turmoil within the Catholic faith and within Vatican City.

Plot 

Windswept House describes a satanic ritual – the enthronement of Lucifer – taking place at Saint Paul's Chapel inside Vatican City, on June 29, 1963. The book gives a depiction of high-ranking churchmen, cardinals, archbishops and prelates of the Roman curia, taking oaths signed with their own blood, plotting to destroy the Church from within. It tells the story of an international organized attempt by these Vatican insiders and secular internationalists to force a pope of the Catholic Church to abdicate, so that a successor may be chosen that will fundamentally change orthodox faith and establish a New World Order.

Fact or fiction

The author describes the book as containing "real events and real people masked in the form of a novel", a device he refers to as "faction". According to Martin, 95% of events in the book are real, and 85% of the characters are real people.

Characters 
The Slavic Pope. A geopolitical genius, the Slavic Pope is embattled against the forces of the New World Order and Satan in his defense of the Roman Catholic Church.
Christian Gladstone. A conservative and passionate young priest who descends from the all-powerful Roman Catholic family of the American southwest, the Gladstones. Becomes a pawn in the advancement of the destruction of his beloved Church.
Father Aldo Carnesecca. A simple and unassuming priest who has lived through four popes, Father Carnesecca is valued by his Vatican superiours as "a man of confidences." Unwilling to compromise his principles on the one hand or to cross the threshold of disillusionment and bitterness on the other, he has acquired a detailed knowledge of significant facts, friendships, incidents and decisions in the Rome of the popes. An expert in the rise and fall of the greats, he acts as a valued and intimate advisor to the embattled Slavic Pope, and becomes a valued and intimate friend to Christian Gladstone. Ultimately, his knowledge of hidden things leads not only to a maniacal scheme against his life, but to the unraveling of the darkest mystery lying at the heart of papal Rome.
Master General Damien Slattery. Father-General of the Dominican Order, the Irish giant, Father Damien Duncan Slattery is a man of extraordinary appetite, and the dimensions to go with it. Slattery is Irish to the core, and the staunchest of the staunch among the small band of supporters dedicated to the papacy and to the Slavic Pope. Archenemy of Cardinal Maestroianni.
Cardinal Silvio Aureatini. A quick-witted man who is a young Cardinal of international accomplishment and huge ambition. A close associate of Cardinal Maestroianni and by his role in the Vatican's powerful Christian Adult Renewal Rite, Aureatini has improved his standing as a mover and shaker in the grave matters of foreign policy.
Cyrus Benthoek. The American head of a powerful transnational law firm based in London. Benthoek is a long-time friend of Cardinal Secretary of State Maestroianni and is held in the highest regard by those in the highest reaches of global power and is one of the main players in the New World Order's plan for worldwide change.
Gibson Appleyard. A US State Department agent who is tasked as an international trouble shooter for the president of the United States and a special committee of industrialist advisors. Appleyard is ordered to oversee the EC's plan for Greater European Market in relation to US interests.
Francesca "Cessi" Gladstone. The matriarchal leader of the powerful Gladstone family. A devout, conservative Catholic who does not recognise the legitimacy of the church after the Second Vatican Council and goes on to challenge both the head of the Vatican Bank, and the Slavic Pope, to boot.

References

Bibliography

 Martin, Malachi, Windswept House: A Vatican Novel, Doubleday, New York, 1996,

External links
 Background information, starharbor.com

1996 novels
Books by Malachi Martin
Catholic novels
Doubleday (publisher) books
Novels set in Rome
Novels set in Vatican City